Homeric psychology is a field of study with regards to the psychology of ancient Greek culture no later than Mycenaean Greece, around 1700–1200 BCE, during the Homeric epic poems (specifically the Illiad and the Odyssey).

History of Homeric psychology
The first scholar to present a theory was Bruno Snell in his 1953 book, originally in German. His argument was that the ancient Greek individual did not have a sense of self, and that later the Greek culture "self-realized" or "discovered" what we consider to be the modern "intellect".

Later, Eric Robertson Dodds in 1951, wrote how ancient Greek thought may have been irrational, as compared to modern "rational" culture. In this Dodds' theory, the Greeks may have known that an individual did things, but the reason an individual did things were attributed to divine externalities, such as gods or daemons.

Julian Jaynes proposed a theory in 1976. He stipulated that Greek consciousness emerged from the use of special words related to cognition. Some of Jaynes' findings were empirically supported in a 2021 study by Boban Dedović, a psychohistorian. The study compared the word counts of mental language between thirty-four versions of the Iliad and Odyssey.

References 

Cognitive psychology
Consciousness studies
Historical linguistics
Homeric scholarship
Philology
Philosophy of mind